Barbara Pearl Jones (later Slater, born March 26, 1937) is a retired American sprinter. She was part of the 4 × 100 m relay teams that won gold medals at the 1952 and 1960 Olympics and at the 1955 and 1959 Pan American Games. At the 1952 Olympics she became the youngest woman to win an Olympic gold medal in athletics, aged 15 years 123 days. She later became a member of the U.S. Paralympic Games Committee.

References

1937 births
American female sprinters
Tennessee State Lady Tigers track and field athletes
Athletes (track and field) at the 1952 Summer Olympics
Athletes (track and field) at the 1955 Pan American Games
Athletes (track and field) at the 1959 Pan American Games
Athletes (track and field) at the 1960 Summer Olympics
Olympic gold medalists for the United States in track and field
World record setters in athletics (track and field)
Track and field athletes from Chicago
Living people
Medalists at the 1960 Summer Olympics
Medalists at the 1952 Summer Olympics
Pan American Games gold medalists for the United States
Pan American Games medalists in athletics (track and field)
USA Outdoor Track and Field Championships winners
Medalists at the 1955 Pan American Games
Medalists at the 1959 Pan American Games
20th-century American women